is a secondary school located in Fukuoka, on the Japanese island of Kyushu. The school's Department for International Education is well known for its Tsuzuki International Scholarship/Exchange Program which allows Japanese and overseas students to live and study alongside each other in the Fukuoka Daiichi High School Guest House.

The establishment of the school was approved by Fukuoka Prefecture in April 1956.

The  is a scholarship allowing secondary school students to live and study alongside Japanese students in the Fukuoka Daiichi High School Guest House for girls, and Troubadour for boys, a dormitory primarily for the baseballers, in Fukuoka, Japan. The program is administered by the Department for International Education of the Fukuoka Daiichi High School.

Notable alumni 
 Chage
 Tatsunori Fujie
 Naoko Hayashiba
 Seiji Ikaruga
 Daiki Kanei
 Yusuke Karino
 Yukinaga Maeda
 Seiji Matsuyama
 Satoshi Nagano
 Narito Namizato
 Dai-Kang Yang

References

External links 
 

High schools in Fukuoka Prefecture
Fukuoka
Educational institutions established in 1956
Schools in Fukuoka Prefecture
1956 establishments in Japan